This is a list of women writers who were born in Finland or whose writings are closely associated with the country.

A
Uma Aaltonen (1940–2009), author, journalist, politician
Umayya Abu-Hanna (born 1961), Palestinian-born novelist, journalist
Susanna Alakoski (born 1962), novelist, author of Svinalängorna, filmed as Beyond
Outi Alanne (born 1967), novelist using the pen name NeitiNaru
Marianne Alopaeus (1918–2014), novelist, published in Swedish
Tuuve Aro (born 1973), novelist, short story writer, children's writer, several English translations
Isa Asp (1853–1872), poet

B
Kersti Bergroth (1886–1975), novelist, poet, playwright, children's story writer, wrote in both Swedish and Finnish
Christina Regina von Birchenbaum, Finland's earliest female poet writing her autobiographical Een Annor Ny wijsa in 1651 
Anni Blomqvist (1909–1990), Swedish-language novelist, several autobiographical works

C
Minna Canth (1844–1897), important figure in Finnish literature, playwright, novelist, short story writer, addressed women's rights
Kristina Carlson (born 1949), novelist, poet, journalist
Fredrika Wilhelmina Carstens (1808–1888), writer, the author of the first novel published in Finland
Inga-Brita Castrén (1919–2003), theologian

E
Anna Edelheim (1845–1902), journalist
Adelaïde Ehrnrooth (1826–1905), novelist, poet, short story writer, feminist
Elsa Enäjärvi-Haavio (1901–1951), folklorist and educator

F
Tua Forsström (born 1947), Swedish-language poet, translated into English
Maikki Friberg (1861–1927), educator, writer, journal editor, suffragist and peace activist

G
Kaarina Goldberg (born 1956), children's writer, also comic strips

H
Hilja Haapala, pen name of Hilja Dagmar Janhonen (1877–1958), novelist
Lucina Hagman (1853–1946), feminist, biographer
Helinä Häkkänen-Nyholm (born 1971), forensic psychologist
Helvi Hämäläinen (1907–1998), prolific novelist, short story writer, poet
Virpi Hämeen-Anttila (born 1958), best-selling novelist, translator, non-fiction writer, educator
Anne Hänninen (born 1958), poet, essayist
Anna-Leena Härkönen (born 1965), novelist, actress, works adapted for the theatre and television
Saima Harmaja (1913–1937), poet, known for her tragic life and early death 
Satu Hassi (born 1951), politician, environmentalist, novelist, poet, essayist
Pirjo Hassinen (born 1957), novelist, works translated into several languages
Anna-Liisa Hirviluoto (1929–2000), archaeologist, non-fiction writer
Laila Hirvisaari, also Laila Hietamies (1938–2021), best-selling novelist, short story writer, playwright
Elina Hirvonen (born 1975), novelist, journalist, author of Että hän muistaisi saman, translated as When I Forgot
Sofia Hjärne (1780–1860), early Swedish-language novelist, held literary salons
Johanna Holmström (born 1981), short story writer, novelist, writes in Swedish

I

Lempi Ikävalko (1901–1994), poet, journalist, latterly in the United States

J

Tove Jansson (1914–2001), versatile Swedish-language novelist, comic strip writer, children's writer, painter
Eeva Joenpelto (1921–2004), productive novelist, educator
Maria Jotuni (1921–2004), novelist, playwright, short-story writer

K

Sirpa Kähkönen (born 1964), novelist, author of the Kuopio series of historical novels
Elina Kahla (born 1960), philologist, essayist, non-fiction writer
Hilda Käkikoski (1864–1912), politician, children's writer, historian
Aino Kallas (1878–1956), novelist, short story writer, revered contributor to Finnish literature, some works translated into English
Tuula Kallioniemi (born 1951), prolific writer of novels and short stories for children and young adults
Irma Karvikko (1909–1994), journalist, politician
Eeva Kilpi (born 1928), novelist, poet, known for feminist humour, poetry translated into English
Ella Kivikoski (1901–1990), archaeologist, non-fiction writer
Leena Krohn (born 1947), novelist, works translated into several languages including English
Kirsi Kunnas (1924–2021), poet, children's writer, playwright, translator, some works translated into English

L

Sinikka Laine (born 1945), novelist, short story writer, writer of young adult fiction
Leena Lander (born 1955), successful novelist, works translated into several languages including English
Tuija Lehtinen (born 1954), journalist, novelist, works translated into several languages
Leena Lehtolainen (born 1964), widely translated crime fiction writer
Anne Leinonen (born 1973), novelist, science fiction and fantasy
Rosa Liksom (born 1958), novelist, short story writer, children's writer, artist
Irmelin Sandman Lilius (born 1936), writer of picture books and novels for children as well as books for adults and poetry
Minna Lindgren (born 1963), journalist, since 2013 a successful crime-fiction novelist
Marita Lindquist (1918–2016), children's writer, novelist, songwriter, poet
Katri Lipson (born 1965), novelist
Kiba Lumberg (born 1956), novelist, screenwriter for television
Ulla-Lena Lundberg (born 1947), Swedish-language writer, non-fiction, travel, often autobiographical novels

M

Eeva-Liisa Manner (1921–1995), modernist poet, playwright, translator, poems translated into English
Marja-Leena Mikkola (born 1939), novelist, short story writer, poet, songwriter, satirist, translator
Barbara Catharina Mjödh (1738–1776), poet
Eva Moltesen (1871–1934), Finnish-Danish writer and peace activist
Agatha Lovisa de la Myle (1724–1787), poet, wrote in German and Latvian

N
Mikaela Nyman (born 1966), novelist, poet, journalist and editor published in Swedish and English
Carita Nyström (1940–2019), Swedish-speaking writer and feminist

O

Sofi Oksanen (born 1977), best-selling novelist, playwright, internationally recognized through her play Puhdistus, translated as PurgeHagar Olsson (1893–1978), expressionist novelist, playwright, critic, translator

P

Kirsti Paltto (born 1947), Sámi author, children's writer, poet, short story writer, playwright, works translated into several languages
Eila Pennanen (1916–1994), novelist, critic, translator
Kira Poutanen (born 1974), novelist, translator, actress
Helvi Poutasuo (1943–2017), Finnish Sami teacher, translator and newspaper editor
Riikka Pulkkinen (born 1980), widely translated, novelist, columnist

R
Elsa Rautee (1807–1879), poet, songwriter
Mirkka Rekola (1931–2014), highly acclaimed poet, writer of aphorisms
Susanne Ringell (born 1955), short story writer
Hanna Rönnberg (1862–1946), painter and writer
Fredrika Runeberg (1807–1879), novelist, pioneer of Finnish historical fiction, wife of national poet Johan Ludvig Runeberg
Kaisu-Mirjami Rydberg (1905–1959), journalist, newspaper editor, poet, non-fiction writer, politician

S
Pirkko Saisio (born 1949), prolific versatile writer, playwright, novelist, screenwriter
Sally Salminen (1906–1976), Swedish-language novelist, author of KatrinaSolveig von Schoultz (1907–1996), Swedish-language poet, novelist, dramatist
Raija Siekkinen (1953–2004), short story writer, novelist, children's writer
Maria Simointytär, first Finnish-language poet, published Orpolapsen vaikerrus in 1683
Salla Simukka (born 1981), successful young adults author, name a name with The Snow White TrilogyHelena Sinervo (born 1961), poet, poetry translator, novelist, songwriter
Johanna Sinisalo (born 1958), science-fiction writer, author of Ennen päivänlaskua ei voi translated as Not Before SundownAnja Snellman (born 1954), widely translated novelist, poet, journalist, her Pet Shop Girls appeared in English in 2013
Edith Södergran (1892–1923), widely acclaimed Swedish-language modernist poet, translated into English
Katariina Souri (born 1968), novelist
Eira Stenberg (born 1943), poet, children's writer, novelist
Anni Swan (1875–1958), children's writer for girls, journalist and translator
Catharina Charlotta Swedenmarck (1744–1813), Swedish-language poet, playwright, remembered for her pioneering play Dianas festT
Maila Talvio (1871–1951), playwright, short story writer, novelist 
Eeva Tikka (born 1939), novelist
Märta Tikkanen (born 1935), Swedish-language novelist, journalist, author of ManrapeAale Tynni (1913–1997), poet, translator, editor

U

Kaari Utrio (born 1942), historical novelist, historian
Arja Uusitalo (born 1951), poet, journalist

V
Katri Vala (1901–1944), poet, critic, attacked war and Fascism
Anja Vammelvuo (1921–1988), poet and writer
Marja-Liisa Vartio (1924–1966), poet and prose writer
Monica Vikström-Jokela (born 1960), children's writer, television script writer
Kerttu Vuolab (born 1951), Sami-language novelist, songwriter, translator

W
Sara Wacklin (1790–1846), Swedish-language writer, author of the successful novel Hundrade minnen från Österbotten'' (A Hundred Memories of Ostrobothnia)
Helena Westermarck (1857–1938), artist, Swedish-language women's historian, biographer, novelist
Sara Wesslin (born 1991), Finnish Sami journalist, supporter of the Skolt Sami language
Hella Wuolijoki (1886–1954), Estonian-born Finnish-language novelist, politician, used the pen name Juhani Tervapää

See also
List of Finnish authors
List of women writers

References

-
Finnish women writers, List of
Writers
Women writers, List of Finnish